State Trunk Highway 22 (often called Highway 22, STH-22 or WIS 22) is a state highway in the U.S. state of Wisconsin. The route's trajectory is mostly south to north, with the exception of the segment between Shawano and the northern terminus being east–west.  It is generally a two-lane surface road providing a connecting route between Waupaca, Shawano, Gillett and Oconto.  Various urban sections have multilane segments.

Route description

WIS 22's southern terminus is in Columbia County at the junction of US 51 and WIS 60 in North Leeds, two miles (3 km) east of Arlington.  From there the route heads north for twelve miles (19 km) and crosses WIS 16 at Wyocena.  At another four miles (6 km) further north, the highway junctions with WIS 44 in Pardeeville and WIS 33 two miles (3 km) north of Pardeeville.  The highway crosses into Marquette County at CTH CM.

WIS 22 passes north through the eastern portion of Marquette County where it meets WIS 23 in Montello. There is a short cosigning with 23 in town heading east before 22 turns north again.  The highway then joins WIS 21 briefly in Wautoma.  Both routes cross WIS 73 in the downtown area and WIS 21 splits southeast following WIS 73 while WIS 22 continues north, passing through Wild Rose eight miles (13 km) north of Wautoma. WIS 22 passes through the southeast corner of Portage County for about one mile (1.6 km) as it turns eastward. The highway stairsteps northeast for about nine miles (14 km), passing around Rural and King as it proceeds toward Waupaca. WIS 22 merges onto US 10 east (also carrying WIS 49 south and WIS 54 east) for one and a half miles, forming a brief wrong-way concurrency with WIS 49.  Along with WIS 54, WIS 22 turns off US 10 to the north and into the city via Churchill Street.  The two highways then turn east onto Royalton Street southeast of the city center and follow the Little Wolf River's south branch northeast.

WIS 110 joins the two highway five miles east of Waupaca, and WIS 54 turns east off the route two miles (3 km) northeast of that point to continue following the river. WIS 22 and WIS 110 pass through Manawa and junction with WIS 161 west four miles (6 km) north of the city.  WIS 110 continues north at that point while WIS 22 turns east and passes through the small community of Symco.  WIS 22 turns north onto US 45 where WIS 76 begins nine miles (14 km) east of Symco.  WIS 22 continues north along US 45 for  then splits north while US 45 turns west in Clintonville. The western terminus of WIS 156 connects with the route one mile (1.6 km) north of the US 45 junction.  WIS 22 passes through Embarrass on the Shawano County line.

WIS 22 passes northwest of the small communities of Adams Beach and Belle Plaine as it turns northeast and approaches Shawano. WIS 22 junctions with WIS 29 southwest of the city and passes into the city itself along Main Street.  The highway turns east onto Green Bay Street, joining WIS 47 and Wisconsin Highway 55 south for two miles (3 km) within the city.  WIS 47 and WIS 55 then turn south onto Airport Road and WIS 22 passes northeast around the southeast side of Shawano Lake and through Cecil, junctioning with WIS 117.  The highway enters Oconto County at Pulcifer.

WIS 22 joins WIS 32 south in Gillett and the two routes run concurrent for three miles (5 km) east to where WIS 32 turns south off while WIS 22 continues east, passing through Oconto Falls. In 2014, an 8.1-mile stretch of STH 22 between Gillett and Onconto Falls was honored with the Sheldon G. Hayes Award for being the smoothest asphalt pavement in the country. The highway crosses US 141 in Stiles Junction eight miles (13 km) west of its eastern terminus at US 41 in Oconto. The terminus is adjacent to Copper Culture State Park.

History

WIS 22's original route follows the current route from Wautoma to Oconto, not including any reroutes that were in place such as the one around Waupaca.  The segment south of Wautoma was opened in 1947. The eastern terminus changed in 2015 to the new US 41 bypass around Oconto, shortening the highway's length by about 0.6 miles. The previous terminus extended to what is now Bus. US 41 and County Trunk Y.

Major intersections

See also

References

External links

022
Transportation in Columbia County, Wisconsin
Transportation in Marquette County, Wisconsin
Transportation in Waushara County, Wisconsin
Transportation in Portage County, Wisconsin
Transportation in Waupaca County, Wisconsin
Transportation in Shawano County, Wisconsin
Transportation in Oconto County, Wisconsin